This list is of the Cultural Properties of Japan designated in the category of  for the Prefecture of Gifu.

National Cultural Properties
As of 1 February 2016, nine Important Cultural Properties have been designated (including one *National Treasure), being of national significance.

Prefectural Cultural Properties
As of 18 September 2015, one hundred and four properties have been designated at a prefectural level.

See also
 Cultural Properties of Japan
 List of National Treasures of Japan (paintings)
 Japanese painting
 List of Historic Sites of Japan (Gifu)
 List of Museums in Gifu Prefecture

References

External links
  Cultural Properties in Gifu Prefecture

Cultural Properties,Gifu
Cultural Properties,Paintings
Paintings,Gifu
Lists of paintings